The Institute of Electrical and Electronics Engineers sponsors more than 1,600 annual conferences and meetings worldwide. IEEE is also highly involved in the technical program development of numerous events including trade events, training workshops, job fairs, and other programs.

List

References 

 
Lists of conferences